The 2019 Erewash Borough Council election was held on 2 May 2019 to elect members of Erewash Borough Council in Derbyshire, England. The whole council was up for election.

Summary

Election results

|-

Erewash Borough Council - Results by Ward

Awsworth Road

Breaston

Cotmanhay

Derby Road East

Derby Road West

Draycott and Risley

Hallam Fields

Kirk Hallam and Stanton By Dale

Larklands

Little Eaton and Stanley

Little Hallam

Long Eaton Central

Nottingham Road

Ockbrook and Borrowash

Sandiacre

Sawley

Shipley View

West Hallam and Dale Abbey

Wilsthorpe

By-elections

Hallam Fields

Nottingham Road

References

May 2019 events in the United Kingdom
2019 English local elections
2019
2010s in Derbyshire